BOTW may refer to:

Bridge over Troubled Water, album by Simon & Garfunkel
Bull of the Woods, 1969 album by The 13th Floor Elevators
Best of the West, American sitcom
The Legend of Zelda: Breath of the Wild, a 2017 video game for the Wii U and Nintendo Switch
Bank of the West, financial services company
Band on the Wall, live music venue

See also
Best of the Worst (disambiguation)
Bottom of the World (disambiguation)